Karl Josef Seitz (4 September 1869 – 3 February 1950) was an Austrian politician of the Social Democratic Workers' Party. He served as member of the Imperial Council, President of the National Council and Mayor of Vienna.

Early life
Seitz was born in Vienna, at the time capital of the Austro-Hungarian Empire. He was the son of a struggling small-time coal trader. After the premature death of his father, in 1875, the family was thrown into abject poverty, and Seitz had to be sent off to an orphanage.

He nonetheless received adequate education and earned a scholarship so that he could enroll in a teacher-training college in the city of St. Pölten, Lower Austria. In 1888, he took employment as a public elementary school teacher in Vienna.

Already an outspoken Social Democrat, he was disciplined several times for his political activism. His founding of a Social Democratic teachers' union in 1896 led to his delegation into the Lower Austrian Board of Education in 1897, which then led to his termination as a teacher, later that year.

Political career
Seitz now turned to full-time politics and established himself as one of the party's most eminent experts on educational policy. In 1901, Seitz was elected to the Imperial Council and, in 1902, to the provincial parliament of Lower Austria. Following the outbreak of World War I in 1914, Seitz developed pronounced pacifist leanings and participated in the 1917 Stockholm Socialists' Congress.

Seitz entered history in 1918, when Austria-Hungary was breaking down, and its disintegration into smaller independent nation states was becoming manifest. On 21 October the Imperial Council members representing the empire's ethnically German provinces moved to form a Provisional National Assembly for "German Austria". In its constituent session, the Provisional National Assembly appointed Seitz as one of its three chairmen. All three presidents together functioned as head of state in the "Staatsratsdirektorium". After the election to the Constituent National Assembly, this was changed on 15 March 1919 so that Seitz became the First President, while the other two presidents became deputies of the First President. The First President was also to be Head of State. He retained this position until 9 December 1920.

President
Almost simultaneously, Seitz was also appointed provisional chairman of the Social Democratic Workers' Party of Austria following the death of party nestor Victor Adler. In 1919, his positions both as President of Austria and as party chairman were formalized.

Following the implementation of the definitive Constitution of Austria on 1 October 1920, Seitz declined to seek re-election, leaving office on 9 December. He did, however, not retire from politics and retained both his party chairmanship and his seat in the newly established National Council, Seitz now devoted his attention to Vienna local affairs.

Mayor of Vienna
On 13 November 1923, he was elected Mayor of Vienna.

The extensive and competently administered public welfare and education programs that he implemented, particularly promoting the building of residences, were very popular, even by his party's opponents, and they were positively remembered for decades.

Personal life
Karl Seitz married Emma Seidel, daughter of Amalie Seidel, one of the first women members of the Austrian parliament.

Later life
With the rise of the Fatherland Front in 1934 and Social Democracy's failed insurrection against the federal government, the Social Democratic Worker's Party was outlawed. Having thus lost his party chairmanship, Seitz was also removed from his post as a mayor and taken into custody, to be released without charge a few weeks later. Even though a majority of Viennese considered his removal from office illegitimate, Seitz's political career had essentially been brought to an end.

Continuing to live in Vienna, Seitz witnessed the Anschluss with Nazi Germany in 1938 and the outbreak of World War II in 1939. There were contacts with the important resistance group (Maier-Mesner group, CASSIA) around the later executed priest Heinrich Maier, who was in contact with the American secret service OSS. The priest Maier had set up an information network in order to receive important information and to realize political plans for after the war. In 1944, he was placed under arrest a second time and for a time, was even imprisoned in the Ravensbrück concentration camp, only to again return to Vienna when Nazi Germany eventually collapsed, in May 1945. Though now ill, Seitz served the newly established Social Democratic Party of Austria as its honorary chairman and a nominal National Council member until his death, at the age of 80.

References

External links 

 

1869 births
1950 deaths
Politicians from Vienna
Social Democratic Party of Austria politicians
Presidents of Austria
Members of the Austrian House of Deputies (1901–1907)
Members of the Austrian House of Deputies (1907–1911)
Members of the Austrian House of Deputies (1911–1918)
Members of the Provisional National Assembly
Members of the Constituent National Assembly (Austria)
Members of the National Council (Austria)
Mayors of Vienna
Members of the Executive of the Labour and Socialist International
Austrian Civil War
Austrian people of World War II
Ravensbrück concentration camp survivors